Maiden Lane is a street in Covent Garden, London, that runs from Bedford Street in the west to Southampton Street in the east. The painter J. M. W. Turner was born in the street in 1775.

History

The street is based on an ancient track that ran through the Convent Garden to St. Martin's Lane. According to Isaac D'Israeli, the street was named after a statue of the Virgin Mary that once stood in the street. It was built up from 1631 to 1728. In 1727–28, Voltaire stayed at the White Wig Inn while he was exiled from Paris. The painter J.M.W. Turner was born above his father's barber shop at number 21 in 1775.

The British Socialist Party established their offices at 21a Maiden Lane. This premises was taken over by the Communist Party of Great Britain during their first year of existence.

Buildings
Corpus Christi Roman Catholic Church is located in the street. The restaurant Rules is at No. 34.

Europe's first recording studio was opened here in 1898.

See also
Maiden Lane Estate, King's Cross.
York Way, King's Cross. Formerly known as Mayde Lane and Maiden Lane.

References

External links

http://www.british-history.ac.uk/survey-london/vol36/pp239-252

Covent Garden
Streets in the City of Westminster